The Vampire Diaries is an American supernatural drama television series that premiered on The CW on September 10, 2009, and concluded on March 10, 2017 after airing eight seasons. Screenwriters Kevin Williamson and Julie Plec adapted the show from L. J. Smith's novel series of the same name. The series takes place in Mystic Falls, Virginia, a fictional small town haunted by supernatural beings. It centers on the love triangle between the protagonist Elena Gilbert (Nina Dobrev) and vampire-brothers Stefan Salvatore (Paul Wesley) and Damon Salvatore (Ian Somerhalder). As the narrative develops in the course of the show, the focal point shifts on the mysterious past of the town involving Elena's malevolent doppelgänger Katherine Pierce (Dobrev) and the family of Original Vampires, all of whom have an evil agenda of their own.

The series has been nominated for many awards, including 67 Teen Choice Awards (30 wins), 27 People's Choice Awards (five wins), and eight Saturn Awards. The three lead protagonists—Dobrev, Wesley and Somerhalder—have received the most nominations. Lead actress Dobrev was nominated for 21 awards, winning five Teen Choice Awards, a People's Choice Award, and a Young Hollywood Award. Somerhalder earned widespread critical acclaim for his role of Damon Salvatore, and is the most nominated cast member with 30 nominations.

Awards and nominations

Notes

References

External links
 

Awards and nominations
Lists of awards by television series